Butterz is an independent record label based in London that specializes in grime music. It was founded by DJs and music producers Elijah and Skilliam. The label helped bring grime instrumentals to the forefront of the electronic music scene, and was ranked 10th in Fact's "The 10 Best Record Labels of 2011".

History

Butterz began as a blog in 2007, run by Elijah and Skilliam. The blog consisted of downloads, interviews and features with grime musicians.

The label was formed in March 2010 and has since released grime music both digitally and on vinyl, from artists including Terror Danjah, Newham Generals, Royal-T, DJ Q, Flava D Swindle, Champion, P Money and Trim. In 2010 it was announced that the blog was ending so as to focus solely on the label.

David Kelly has designed all of the label's artwork, which for a long time, only used two colours: black and yellow.

Radio show 
Elijah and Skilliam had a weekly regular show on Rinse FM from 2008 to 2014. In 2011, Elijah and Skilliam released Rinse: 17, a mixed compilation album featuring material from the radio show and the label.

Events 
Butterz events take place in various nightclubs with label artists alongside guests. They have included appearances from JME, Skepta, Kode 9, DJ EZ, Joker and Kano.
From 2013 to 2016 Elijah & Skilliam ran an offshoot night Jamz, with regular parties in Leeds, Manchester, Berlin and Liverpool, which ended with a final session streamed live on Boiler Room.

Catalog

See also
List of independent UK record labels

References

External links 

British record labels
Electronic music record labels
Record labels established in 2007
Grime music